Zowl Piran (also Romanized as Z̄owl Pīrān; also known as Davāl Pīrān) is a village in Jirdeh Rural District, in the Central District of Shaft County, Gilan Province, Iran. At the 2006 census, its population was 723, in 173 families.

References 

Populated places in Shaft County